Fırat Akkoyun (born January 1, 1982) is a Turkish retired footballer. He played as a fullback.

References

1982 births
Living people
People from Sarıoğlan
Turkish footballers
Ankaraspor footballers
Erzurumspor footballers
Hatayspor footballers
Kayserispor footballers
Konyaspor footballers
Süper Lig players

Association football defenders